El Senador is the original name of a luxury 4-star resort located in Cayo Coco, Cuba.  It was owned as a joint venture between Cubanacan, a Cuban tourism company, and a syndicate of Canadian businesses.  In December 2005 the Canadians sold their interest to an Anglo-Dutch syndicate, and the owners engaged the Spanish group NH Hotels as operator. The resort was renamed the NH Krystal Laguna Villas and Resort, until December 2010, when NH ceased to manage it. From 2012, the hotel has been separated into two parts, both to be managed by the Iberostar group - part branded the Iberostar Mojito and the other the Iberostar Cayo Coco.

When it opened, it was the largest hotel in Cuba; it remains one of the largest hotels, with almost 700 rooms.

Former NHL star and captain of the Montreal Canadiens, Serge Savard, was also part owner.  The name "El Senador" was a reference to his nickname "Le Senateur" (The Senator).

The hotel lies along a beach with 600m of white sands and tropical water.  There is a nearby coral reef and located within the resort grounds is a natural lagoon. Some of the villas are situated on the lagoon, which is crossed by pontoon walkways.

There are four swimming pools (one specially designed for kids), amusement areas for the family and gardens.  Nearby there are shops featuring local artists, cigar stores and souvenir stores. There are also several restaurants featuring a variety of foods, including Italian, Chinese, Cuban as well as two buffets and a steakhouse.

The company which owns the hotel continues to be named El Senador S.A.

External links 
Iberostar website
NH Krystal website
NH Krystal Resort

Resorts in Cuba
Hotels in Cuba